Mohamed Boubekeur (born 1941) is a Moroccan boxer. He competed in the men's light welterweight event at the 1960 Summer Olympics.

References

1941 births
Living people
Moroccan male boxers
Olympic boxers of Morocco
Boxers at the 1960 Summer Olympics
People from Tafraout
Light-welterweight boxers